The 2010 Città di Como Challenger was a professional tennis tournament played on outdoor clay courts. It was the fifth edition of the tournament which is part of the 2010 ATP Challenger Tour. It took place in Como, Italy between August 30 and September 5, 2010.

ATP entrants

Seeds

 Rankings are as of August 23, 2010.

Other entrants
The following players received wildcards into the singles main draw:
  Paolo Lorenzi
  Thomas Muster
  Matteo Trevisan
  Filippo Volandri

The following players received entry as an alternate into the singles main draw:
  Juan-Martín Aranguren
  Andrea Arnaboldi
  Daniele Giorgini

The following players received entry as a Special Exempt into the singles main draw:
  Alberto Brizzi
  David Goffin

The following players received entry from the qualifying draw:
  Johannes Ager
  Gianluca Naso
  Cedrik-Marcel Stebe
  Walter Trusendi

Champions

Singles

 Robin Haase def.  Ivo Minář, 6–4, 6–3

Doubles

 Frank Moser /  David Škoch def.  Martin Emmrich /  Mateusz Kowalczyk, 5–7, 7–6(2), [10–5]

External links
Official Site
ITF Search 

Citta di Como Challenger
Clay court tennis tournaments
Città di Como Challenger
Città di Como Challenger
Città di Como Challenger
Città di Como Challenger